Louis III de La Trémoille (1521 – 25 March 1577), 1st Duke of Thouars, was a sixteenth-century French nobleman of the La Tremoille family.  He was the son of François II de La Trémoille and his wife, Anne de Laval.

Louis accompanied the dauphin on a voyage to Perpignan in 1542, served in the war against the English in Picardy and was one of the four barons given as a hostage of the Holy Ampoule at the consecration of Henry II, and one of the hostages of the peace treaty concluded in 1542 between France and England.

In 1549, he married Jeanne de Montmorency (1528–1596), the second daughter of Anne de Montmorency.  They had five children, including:

 Louis, comte de Benon,
 Claude, Duke of Thouars, married Charlotte of Nassau
 Charlotte-Catherine de La Trémoille (1568–1629), who married Henri I de Bourbon, prince de Condé.

Louis served in Italy under Marshal de Cossé. In 1560, he was a lieutenant general of Poitou and of Saintonge.  He was charged, in 1567, with the command of the Loire Valley, served under the Duke of Anjou and was killed at the siege of Melle on 25 March 1577, at the moment when the city fell.

References

Sources

1521 births
1577 deaths
Louis III
Dukes of Thouars
16th-century French people
People of Byzantine descent